Norris Point is a community in the Canadian province of Newfoundland and Labrador.

Located on the northern peninsula of Newfoundland and 10 minutes south of Rocky Harbour, the community hosts a marine biology centre, a pharmacy, a modern health care facility, and several businesses. The community is adjacent to Gros Morne National Park.

Norris Point is located on the northern side of Bonne Bay and is named after one of its first settlers, Neddy Norris, who came to the area with his wife and children between 1789 and 1790. The Norrises apparently disappeared or left the area; consequently, there is no official account of their residency.

Demographics 

References

Towns in Newfoundland and Labrador